Kaymakam Kürşat Ağca, historically Mağaracık, is a village in the Polateli District, Kilis Province, Turkey. The village had a population of 165 in 2022.

In late 19th century, German orientalist Martin Hartmann listed the village as a settlement of 7 houses inhabited by Turks.

References

Villages in Polateli District